The 1992 Supercoppa Italiana was a match played by the 1991–92 Serie A winners Milan and 1991–92 Coppa Italia winners Parma. It took place on 30 August 1992 at the San Siro in Milan, Italy. A.C. Milan won the match 2–1 to earn their second Supercoppa.

Match details

1992
Supercoppa 1992
Supercoppa 1992
Supercoppa Italiana